China–Georgia relations are the foreign relations between Georgia and the People's Republic of China. The two countries established diplomatic relations on 9 June 1992. Bilateral ties have advanced gradually since then and mostly focused on economic cooperation. China has an embassy in Tbilisi, and Georgia has an embassy in Beijing. By 2017, China had become Georgia's fourth largest trading partner and the second largest exporting market for Georgian wine. China has been appreciative of Georgia's commitment to One-China policy and has supported Georgia's territorial integrity by refusing to recognize Abkhazia and South Ossetia.

History 
The Yuan Shi, the official history of the Yuan Dynasty of China, records the fate of Georgia in 1252. In that year, the Mongol khagan Möngke, who was expanding into China, granted the Kingdom of Georgia, which had submitted to Mongol overlordship, to Berke. Chu'ü-erh-chih, the Chinese name used for Georgia in the Yuan Shi, is etymologically the same as "Georgia".

Political ties 
The China–Georgia relations were officially established on 9 June 1992, when China extended its diplomatic recognition to the Republic of Georgia after the dissolution of the Soviet Union. Eduard Shevardnadze, then Georgia's head of state, paid a state visit to China in June 1993 and signed several agreements, principally on economic and trade cooperation. Mikheil Saakashvili, the then-President of Georgia, was in China on an official visit in April 2006.

The two countries maintained communication and coordination at the United Nations and other international organizations. Georgia has maintained its "one-China policy" and does not recognize Taiwan. In its turn, China, member of the Shanghai Cooperation Organisation (SCO), refused to follow the suit of Russia, a fellow SCO member, in recognition of the independence of Georgia's breakaway Abkhazia and South Ossetia in the aftermath of the August 2008 Russo–Georgian War despite the appeal by the Russian Foreign Ministry. Instead, the SCO issued the Dushanbe Declaration, calling on all parties to solve the "existing problems" through diplomacy. Similarly, a Chinese Foreign Ministry spokesman expressed the agency's concern due to the "latest development in South Ossetia and Abkhazia", responding to a journalist's question regarding China's position on Russia's recognition of the disputed territories. In the view of the political analyst Joseph Larsen, "while China does not present an alternative to NATO and EU integration... relations with China have the potential to complement Georgia's existing foreign policy."

Economic ties 
Bilateral economic ties have gradually expanded since 1992 and witnessed further growth beginning in 2010 as Georgia's economy recovered from the 2008 war. China views Georgia as part of the One Belt One Road Initiative, a project it launched in 2013 to "shorten the distance between China and Europe" through improved infrastructure connections. By 2014, China had accounted for $217.94 million in foreign direct investment in Georgia, putting it in fourth place after Azerbaijan, the Netherlands, and the United States. A number of Chinese companies have launched major operations in Georgia. China's Hualing Group, mainly focused on construction and management of hotels and trade centers, was Georgia's single largest foreign investor as of 2017. Some of the company's projects in Georgia include a Free Industrial Zone in Kutaisi, Georgia's second largest city, and a large residential and commercial complex in a suburb of the capital city of Tbilisi. In January 2017, the CEFC China Energy agreed to purchase 75% of shares in the Free Industrial Zone at Poti on Georgia's Black Sea coastline. Georgia's main export product to China is wine, which amounted to 5,299,820 bottles in 2016, nearly double the amount exported in the previous year. On 13 May 2017, Georgia and China signed a Free Trade Agreement.

Diplomacy

People's Republic of China
Tbilisi (Embassy)

Georgia
Beijing (Embassy)

See also 
 Foreign relations of China
 Foreign relations of Georgia 
 Georgia–Hong Kong relations

References 

 
Bilateral relations of Georgia (country)
Georgia